Stanley Reid (born 5 May 1955) is an Australian former cricketer. He played eleven first-class matches for Tasmania between 1981 and 1983.

See also
 List of Tasmanian representative cricketers

References

External links
 

1955 births
Living people
Australian cricketers
Tasmania cricketers
Cricketers from Tasmania